Emily Bates (born 18 October 1995) is an Australian rules footballer with the Hawthorn Football Club in the AFL Women's (AFLW). She previously played for the Brisbane Lions from 2017 to season seven. She represented Brisbane in 2016, the last year that the games were held, and was drafted by the club with the second selection in the 2016 AFL Women's draft prior to the inaugural AFL Women's season.

Bates won an AFL Women's premiership with Brisbane in 2021 and was awarded the league's highest individual accolade, the AFL Women's best and fairest, in 2022. She is also a three-time AFL Women's All-Australian and four-time Brisbane best and fairest winner, and is the AFL Women's equal games record holder with 66 games.

Early life
Bates was born in 1995 in Victoria one of three sisters. At the age of 3 she moved with her parents from Victoria to the Sunshine Coast in Queensland before eventually settling in Brisbane. Her father Lloyd Bates was an ex-Victorian and a key figure in Queensland football, encouraged Emily to play football at his Yeronga Football Club. Through him she grew up with a football in her hand and when a girl's team started up in 2011, she joined as a junior with her father as team coach with the two winning the under 15 junior premiership. Lloyd passed of cardiac arrest when she was 15 and QAFLW medal is named in his honour. She was educated at Brigidine College, Indooroopilly.

In 2011 and 2012 she represented Queensland at under-18 level in both cricket and Australian rules football (as captain), but she ultimately chose Australian rules football over a cricket career.

She won the Best & Fairest in the QWAFL in 2016.

AFL Women's career
Bates was taken with the number two pick, 's first, in the 2016 AFL Women's draft. She was announced as one of the "values leaders" to assist captain Emma Zielke alongside Sabrina Frederick-Traub, Leah Kaslar and Sam Virgo in January 2017. She made her debut in the Lions' inaugural game against  at Casey Fields in the opening round of the 2017 AFL Women's season.

Bates was nominated by her teammates for the 2017 AFLW Players’ Most Valuable Player Award, was named Brisbane's best and fairest and was also listed in the All-Australian team.

Brisbane signed Bates for the 2018 season during the trade period in May 2017.

Brisbane signed Bates for the 2020 season during the trade and sign period in April 2019.

In the 2022 season (January–April), Bates elevated her game to new heights and averaged nearly 22 disposals and six tackles a game, becoming the Lions' best player. She polled 21 votes in the best-and-fairest count and became the club's first league best-and-fairest recipient, the highest individual accolade in the sport. She also earned the Coaches Association Champion Player of the Year award and the Players Association Most Valuable Player (MVP) award, which made her the second player in the competition's history to win all three individual end-of-season awards.

Statistics
Updated to the end of S7 (2022).

|-
| 2017 ||  || 1
| 8 || 1 || 1 || 84 || 41 || 125 || 21 || 38 || 0.1 || 0.1 || 10.5 || 5.1 || 15.6 || 2.6 || 4.8 || 4
|-
| 2018 ||  || 1
| 8 || 0 || 0 || 73 || bgcolor=CAE1FF | 66† || 139 || 18 || 37 || 0.0 || 0.0 || 9.1 || bgcolor=CAE1FF | 8.3† || 17.4 || 2.3 || 4.6 || 4
|-
| 2019 ||  || 1
| 7 || 0 || 1 || 62 || 54 || 116 || 15 || 29 || 0.0 || 0.2 || 8.9 || 7.7 || 16.6 || 2.1 || 4.1 || 1
|-
| 2020 ||  || 1
| 7 || 1 || 1 || 80 || 59 || 139 || 23 || 24 || 0.1 || 0.1 || 11.4 || 8.4 || 19.9 || 3.3 || 3.4 || 4
|-
| bgcolor=F0E68C | 2021# ||  || 1
| 11 || 1 || 1 || 96 || 79 || 175 || 26 || 43 || 0.1 || 0.1 || 8.7 || 7.2 || 15.9 || 2.4 || 3.9 || 6
|-
| 2022 ||  || 1
| 12 || 3 || 2 || 142 || 114 || 256 || 25 || 85 || 0.3 || 0.2 || 11.8 || 9.5 || 21.3 || 2.1 || 7.1 || bgcolor=98FB98 | 21±
|-
| S7 (2022) ||  || 1
| 13 || 3 || 2 || 131 || 105 || 236 || 29 || 85 || 0.2 || 0.2 || 10.1 || 8.1 || 18.2 || 2.2 || 6.5 || 8
|- class=sortbottom
! colspan=3 | Career
! 66 !! 9 !! 8 !! 668 !! 518 !! 1186 !! 157 !! 341 !! 0.1 !! 0.1 !! 10.1 !! 7.8 !! 18.0 !! 2.4 !! 5.2 !! 48
|}

Honours and achievements
Team
 AFL Women's premiership player: 2021
 AFL Women's minor premiership: 2017

Individual
 AFL Women's best and fairest: 2022
 AFLPA AFLW most valuable player: 2022
 AFLCA AFLW champion player of the year: 2022
 AFL Women's equal games record holder
 Brisbane equal games record holder
 3× AFL Women's All-Australian team: 2017, 2018, 2022
 4× Brisbane best and fairest: 2017, 2020, 2022, S7
 Allies representative honours in AFL Women's State of Origin: 2017

References

External links

 
 

1995 births
Living people
Sportspeople from Brisbane
Sportswomen from Queensland
Australian rules footballers from Queensland
Brisbane Lions (AFLW) players
All-Australians (AFL Women's)